The Succession to the throne of Lesotho is laid down in Chapter V of the African kingdom's constitution. The current King is Letsie III.

Chapter V Article 45 of Lesotho's constitution reads:

Line in Succession 
Only male heirs can accede to the throne.

  Moshoeshoe II (1938–1996)
  King Letsie III (born 1963)
 (1) Prince Lerotholi Seeiso (b. 2007)
 (2) Prince Seeiso (b. 1966)
 (3) Prince Bereng Constantine Seeiso 
 (4) Prince Masupha David Seeiso

References

Lesotho